Empress Ju may refer to:

Empress Ju (Liu Wuzhou's wife), wife of Liu Wuzhou, Empress of China (Northern Shanxi) 617 – c. 620
Empress Ju (Xue Ju's wife), wife of Xue Ju, Empress of China (Eastern Gansu) 617–618

Ju